Xylena cineritia, the gray swordgrass moth, is a species of cutworm or dart moth in the family Noctuidae. It is found in northern North America, from New Jersey to Newfoundland and from California to British Columbia.

It eats alder, birch, blueberry, Buffaloberry (Shepherdia canadensis), elder (Sambucus spp.), maple, meadowsweet, oak, poplar, rose, and willow.

The MONA or Hodges number for Xylena cineritia is 9876.

References

Further reading

 
 
 

Xylenini
Articles created by Qbugbot
Moths described in 1875